All heal, allheal or all-heal may refer to a number of plants used medicinally including:
 
Prunella vulgaris, a species in the mint family
Stachys, a genus of plants in the mint family
Valeriana officinalis, a species in the valerian family